Shaun S. Sanghani (born June 28, 1980) is an American film producer, financier and writer. He is the founder and president of SSS Entertainment and SSS Film Capital. He is best known as the producer of The Fallout, The Last Full Measure, King Cobra, Alone Together, and American Traitor: The Trial of Axis Sally.

Early life and education 
Sanghani was born in Cleveland, Ohio on June 28, 1980 and raised in Alexandria, Louisiana. In 1998, he moved to New Orleans, Louisiana to attend Tulane University, from which he received a Bachelor of Arts in Psychology. In 2003, he earned an MBA in Finance/Marketing from Tulane University’s A. B. Freeman School of Business. He later enrolled at the USC School of Cinematic Arts, from which he would earn a Master of Fine Arts in Screenwriting.

Career 
In 2007, Sanghani founded film production company SSS Entertainment. Since the company’s inception, he has been credited as the producer of over 60 films, including Class Rank (2017), The Last Full Measure (2019), and Axis Sally (2020).

In 2018, Variety magazine named Sanghani as one of its annual "10 Producers to Watch".

In 2019, Sanghani partnered with Louisiana-based Red River Bank to form SSS Film Capital, a film fund & financing unit of SSS Entertainment. Sanghani has stated that the unit, which includes a multimillion-dollar credit facility, was created in order to "grow our slate and move into bigger-budget fare with bigger talent".

Following the premiere of South by Southwest Grand Jury Award winner The Fallout (film), SSS Entertainment announced the launch of The Syndicate, a sales arm focused on "accessible and recognizable" features, debuting with upcoming films Alone Together, starring and directed by Katie Holmes, and Neil Labute’s House of Darkness. At the time, Sanghani commented on SSS Film Capital's success throughout the COVID-19 pandemic.

In 2022, SSS Entertainment disclosed the beginning of ongoing talks with a group of U.S. private equity firms.

Filmography

Film

 2012 – True Crime: The Movie (executive producer)
 2013 – White Rabbit (produced by)
 2015 – All Mistakes Buried (produced by, writer)
 2016 – King Cobra (produced by)
 2016 – Jack Goes Home (executive producer)
 2016 – Welcome to Willits (produced by)
 2017 – Class Rank (produced by)
 2017 – The Vault (executive producer)
 2017 – Blood Heist (produced by)
 2017 – Blood Ride (produced by)
 2017 – Blood Surf (produced by)
 2018 – Welcome the Stranger (executive producer)
 2018 – Avengers of Justice: Farce Wars (produced by)
 2018 – Brampton’s Own (executive producer)
 2018 – Kill the Czar (produced by)
 2018 – River Runs Red (executive producer)
 2018 – The Escape of Prisoner 614 (produced by)
 2019 – Crypto (executive producer)
 2019 – The Informer (executive producer)
 2019 – Burn (executive producer)
 2019 – The Last Full Measure (produced by)
 2019 – The Pretenders (produced by)
 2019 – The Sound of Silence (executive producer)
 2019 – 10 Minutes Gone (produced by)
 2020 – Axis Sally (produced by)
 2020 – Bailey & Darla (executive producer)
 2020 – Infamous (produced by)
 2020 – Survive the Night (produced by)
 2020 – I Used to Go Here (executive producer)
 2020 – Open Source (produced by)
 2020 – Force of Nature (produced by)
 2020 – Son of the South (film) (executive producer)
 2021 – Last Survivors (produced by)
 2021 – Midnight in the Switchgrass (executive producer)
 2021 – The Birthday Cake (executive producer)
 2021 – Catch the Fair One (executive producer)
 2021 – American Traitor: The Trial of Axis Sally (produced by)
 2021 – The Fallout (produced by)
 2022 – Gone in the Night (produced by)
 2022 – The Last Victim (produced by)
 2022 – Panama (produced by)
 2022 – Savage Salvation (produced by)
 2022 – Private Property (produced by)
 2022 – Alone Together (produced by)
 2022 – House of Darkness (produced by)

Television

 2009 – Guardian Angels (writer/creator, co-executive producer)
 2013 – The Governor's Wife (writer/creator, executive producer)
 2013 – Girls Gone Bayou (writer/creator, executive producer)
 2013 – Hardcore Hobbies (writer/creator, executive producer)

References

External links 

1980 births
Living people
American film producers
American male screenwriters
American screenwriters of Indian descent
Tulane University alumni
USC School of Cinematic Arts alumni